Eotetraodon is an extinct genus of prehistoric pufferfish that lived during the Lutetian epoch of middle Eocene.  Fossil specimens are from the Monte Bolca lagerstatten (E. pygmaeus), and the Kuma Horizon of the Gorny Luch locality, from the North Caucasus (E. gornylutshensis).

References

Eocene fish
Tetraodontidae
Prehistoric life of Europe